Ha Wiji (1387–1456) was a scholar-official of the early Joseon Dynasty, and is remembered as one of the six martyred ministers. He was born to a yangban family of the Jinju Ha lineage. He passed the lower national service examination in 1435 and received the top score on the higher examination in 1438. He was appointed to the Hall of Worthies by Sejong, and became the leader (gyori) of that institution in 1442. He participated in the editing of histories and other texts.

Ha withdrew from government service in 1453 after the murder of Kim Jongseo by Prince Suyang (later King Sejo). However, he returned not long thereafter and was made vice-minister of rites by Danjong in 1455. In that year, Danjong was overthrown by Sejo. Ha joined in a plot to overthrow Sejo and restore Danjong in 1456, but the plot was uncovered through the betrayal of fellow plotter Kim Jil. Refusing to repent from his deeds after torture, Ha was put to death.

See also
Joseon Dynasty politics
List of Joseon Dynasty people

Joseon scholar-officials
1387 births
1456 deaths